Beaufort railway station was a station on the London and North Western Railway's Heads of the Valleys line serving the town of Beaufort in the Welsh county of Brecknockshire.

History
The line was leased and operated by the London and North Western Railway which acquired the smaller railway company on 30 June 1866. Beaufort station opened on 1 March 1864. It became a junction station on 2 September 1867 with the opening of a branch to Ebbw Vale. The station nameboards read "Change for Ebbw Vale" even though the branch service started at Brynmawr. Beaufort was busy with Ebbw Vale traffic until  as there was a daily service to and from Brynamwr of over thirty trains. Ebbw Vale was reached by the  Beaufort Viaduct before reaching Ebbw Vale Junction and the  Rhyd Viaduct. Ebbw Vale station was near the area which is known locally as 'The Crossing', in the town centre.

Beaufort station was situated in a cutting to the west of a road bridge. It stood opposite the Beaufort Ballroom and adjacent to the Beaufort Arms Public House. It had two platforms accessible by flights of steps leading down from the road bridge. The main station building was built of stone, with a timber waiting shelter was provided on the opposite platform. The line to Ebbw Vale closed on 2 April 1951. The Abergavenny line was the next to close when passenger services ceased on 4 January 1958. The last passenger service over the line was an SLS railtour on 5 January 1958 hauled by LNWR 0-8-0 49121 and LNWR 0-6-2 tank 58926' Final closure came on 2 November 1959 when coal traffic from  ceased.

Present
In addition, the cutting which held the station has been infilled to road level.

References

Notes

Sources

Disused railway stations in Blaenau Gwent
Former London and North Western Railway stations
Railway stations in Great Britain opened in 1864
Railway stations in Great Britain closed in 1958
1864 establishments in Wales
1958 disestablishments in Wales